Fernando Estévez may refer to:

Fernando Estévez (football manager) (born 1979), Spanish football manager
Fernando Estévez (sculptor), Spanish sculptor from the 18th century